Diuris callitrophila, commonly known as the Oaklands doubletail or Oaklands diuris, is a species of orchid which is endemic to a small part of southern New South Wales. It has two or three leaves and up to nine whitish and mauve flowers with darker markings and unusually long lateral sepals.

Description
Flowering occurs in November and December.

Taxonomy and naming
Diuris callitrophila was first formally described in 2003 by David Jones from a specimen collected near Oaklands and the description was published in The Orchadian.

Distribution and habitat
The Oaklands doubletail is only known from a few locations between Oaklands and Urana where it grows in small groups in grassy places in Callitris woodland.

Conservation
Diuris callitrophila is classed as "endangered" under the New South Wales Threatened Species Conservation Act. The main threats to the species are its restricted distribution and small population, weed invasion, grazing and inappropriate fire regimes. Steps are being taken to conserve the species by collecting the seed and its associated fungus, growing the orchid and reintroducing it to its natural habitat.

References

callitrophila
Orchids of New South Wales
Endemic orchids of Australia
Plants described in 2003